Empire Central is the fifteenth album and seventh live album by American band Snarky Puppy. It was released on September 30, 2022, on GroundUP Music. It won Best Contemporary Instrumental Album at the 65th Grammy Awards.

Background and recording

Empire Central was recorded live in front of a studio audience over the course of eight days at Deep Ellum Art Company, a converted venue space in Dallas, Texas. The album is an homage to Dallas's rich history of black music. Despite Snarky Puppy originating at University of North Texas in Denton, 30 miles away from Dallas, bandleader Michael League cited Dallas's gospel and R&B scene as what solidified the band's distinct sound. League named Dallas-based musicians Erykah Badu, RC Williams, Roy Hargrove (who partially inspired the track name "Cliroy"), Kirk Franklin, and Jason Moran as influences for the album.

Tracks on the album that allude to Dallas and Texas include "RL's", referring to South Dallas nightclub R.L.'s Blues Palace #2, "Mean Green", named after the North Texas mascot, "Belmont", named for the street in Dallas where League lived, "Fuel City", named for a Texas gas station chain, and "Trinity", named for Texas's Trinity River.

The album features the last recorded performance of funk keyboardist Bernard Wright, who died in a car accident less than two months after the recording sessions. Appearing on the track "Take It!", Wright was described by League as Snarky Puppy's musical "godfather," having mentored many of the band's members and joining the band himself from 2007 to 2010.

Before the album's release in 2022, Snarky Puppy previewed several tracks while on tour with Steely Dan. League credits Steely Dan as one of Snarky Puppy's largest influences, describing touring with them as "a dream."

Composition 

Empire Central draws influence from a variety of genres, including jazz, funk, blues, R&B, gospel, and hard rock. Contrary to the band's previous albums, on which League provided most of the writing, Empire Central features original compositions by 12 different band members.

Critical reception

Empire Central was met with largely positive reviews. At Metacritic, the album received an aggregate score of 75 based on 6 reviews, indicating "generally favorable reviews."

AllMusic's Matt Collar called Empire Central "one of Snarky Puppy's most enjoyable and accessible albums to date," writing that it showcases "the group's longstanding knack for crafting groove-based instrumental tracks rife with hooky melodies, sophisticated arrangements, and exploratory improvisations." He assigned the album an AllMusic Album Pick. In a positive review for Jazzwise, reviewer Hugh Morris called the album "a funkier, heavier, and noticeably slower-paced collection," and "a welcome return of the atmospheric, half-live recording so perfectly pitched on We Like It Here and the Family Dinner volumes." Tina Edwards of The Telegraph praised the album's diverse global influences and old-fashioned sensibilities, calling it "as unclassifiable as it is virtuosic," while also noting it "feels like a collection of singles rather than a chronological record." In a mixed review for JazzTimes, writer Morgan Enos called the music of Empire Central "rock-solid," while at the same time lacking "a certain je ne sais quoi" compared to Snarky Puppy's other albums.

Track listing

Writer credits adapted from Glide Magazine and GroundUP Music.

Personnel

Adapted from Snarky Puppy on YouTube.
 Michael League – electric bass, Minimoog Model D bass
 Bob Lanzetti – electric guitar
 Mark Lettieri – electric guitar
 Chris McQueen – electric guitar
 Justin Stanton – Wurlitzer, Prophet 10, Minimoog Model D, trumpet
 Bobby Sparks – Hammond B3 organ, ARP String Ensemble, Minimoog Model D, Hohner D6 Clavinet
 Bill Laurance – Fender Rhodes Mark 8, Yamaha CP70, Minimoog Model D
 Shaun Martin – talkbox, vocoder, Moog Little Phatty, Korg Kronos, Mellotron
 Zach Brock – violin
 Mike "Maz" Maher – trumpet, flugelhorn
 Jay Jennings – trumpet, flugelhorn
 Chris Bullock – tenor saxophone, bass clarinet, flute
 Bob Reynolds – tenor saxophone, soprano saxophone
 Nate Werth – percussion
 Keita Ogawa – percussion
 Marcelo Woloski – percussion
 Jason "JT" Thomas – drum set
 Larnell Lewis – drum set
 Jamison Ross – drum set

References

2022 albums
Snarky Puppy albums
Grammy Award for Best Contemporary Instrumental Album